The following is a list of National Football League players that have participated in the Olympic Games, with the NFL team for which they played (the team closest to the time of the player's Olympic participation), the sport in which they participated, and their medal count. All represented the United States, except for Colin Ridgway, represented Australia in 1956 and Jahvid Best, represented Saint Lucia in 2016. American football has only been played once in 1932  (though a series demonstration college games were played in 1904).

Players

Summer Olympics

Winter Olympics

References

 "Olympians who played in the NFL". Pro-Football-Reference. Retrieved 2 August 2012.
 "Olympians in the NFL". NFL.com. Retrieved 3 August 2012.
 "Olympians in the NFL: Hayes, Thorpe And More. ThePostGame. Retrieved 19 September 2012.
 "Dropping Back In NFL History: The NFL's Olympians. Football Nation. Retrieved 19 September 2012.

NFL
Olympians